Bakers End is a hamlet in the civil parish of Wareside, in the East Hertfordshire district, in the county of Hertfordshire, England.

Hamlets in Hertfordshire
Wareside